Lu Yun-chang (14 September 1891 – 19 June 1974) was a Chinese politician. She was among the first group of women elected to the Legislative Yuan in 1948.

Biography
She attended , graduating from the Department of Chinese Literature. She subsequently worked as an education inspector in Hebei and Anhui provinces, as headteacher of a girls' school in Tong County in Hebei and as director at Beijing Normal University.

In the 1948 elections to the Legislative Yuan, she ran as a Kuomintang candidate in Shandong and was elected to parliament. She relocated to Taiwan during the Chinese Civil War, where she remained a member of the Legislative Yuan until her death in 1974.

References

1891 births
Chinese educators
Members of the Kuomintang
20th-century Chinese women politicians
Members of the 1st Legislative Yuan
Members of the 1st Legislative Yuan in Taiwan
1974 deaths